Czar is a village in central Alberta, Canada. The motto of Czar is "Where the Cowboys Reign".

Demographics

In the 2016 Census of Population conducted by Statistics Canada, the Village of Czar recorded a population of 202 living in 85 of its 87 total private dwellings, a  change from its 2011 population of 167.

See also
List of communities in Alberta
List of villages in Alberta

References

External links

1917 establishments in Alberta
Villages in Alberta